The 2019 Melbourne Darts Masters was the third staging of the tournament by the Professional Darts Corporation, and was the fourth entry in the 2019 World Series of Darts. The tournament featured 16 players (eight PDC players facing eight regional qualifiers) and was held at the Melbourne Arena in Melbourne, Australia from 16–17 August 2019.

Peter Wright was the defending champion after defeating Michael Smith 11–8 in the 2018 final, but lost 8–0 to Michael van Gerwen in the semi-finals.

Van Gerwen would go on to win his first Melbourne title by defeating Daryl Gurney 8–3 in the final.

Prize money
The total prize fund was £60,000.

Qualifiers
The eight invited PDC representatives, (seeded according to the World Series Order of Merit) are:
  Peter Wright (semi-finals)
  Rob Cross (semi-finals)
  Daryl Gurney (runner-up)
  Michael van Gerwen (champion)
  Gary Anderson (quarter-finals)
  James Wade (first round)
  Simon Whitlock (quarter-finals)
  Raymond van Barneveld (quarter-finals)

The regional qualifiers are:

Draw

References

Melbourne Darts Masters
Melbourne Darts Masters
World Series of Darts
Sports competitions in Melbourne
Melbourne Darts Masters